Macken may refer to:
 Macken, County Fermanagh, a hamlet in Northern Ireland
 Macken, Germany, a municipality in western Germany
 Macken (surname) (including a list of people with the name)
 Macken (TV series), Swedish sitcom
 Macken (song), song in the Swedish songbook Barnens svenska sångbok

See also 
 Maken (disambiguation)
 Mackan, a townland in County Cavan, Ireland